The following is a list of awards and nominations received by British-American actress Dame Angela Lansbury.

Lansbury is one of few performers who have received nominations for all EGOT awards — Emmy, Grammy, Academy Award (Oscar), and Tony Awards.

Lansbury, an icon in musical theatre, received seven Tony Award nominations winning five awards for Mame in 1966, Dear World in 1969, Gypsy in 1975, Sweeney Todd: The Demon Barber of Fleet Street in 1979, and Blithe Spirit in 2009. In 2022 she received the Lifetime Achievement Tony Award. She also earned a Laurence Olivier Award, three Drama Desk Awards, and two Outer Critics Circle Awards. 

For her work in film she earned three Academy Award nominations for Best Supporting Actress for her performances in Gaslight (1944), The Picture of Dorian Gray (1945), and The Manchurian Candidate (1962). She received an Honorary Academy Award for her lifetime achievement in film in 2013. She also earned two Golden Globe Awards for The Picture of Dorian Gray, and The Manchurian Candidate. She earned a Grammy Award nomination for Album of the Year for Beauty and the Beast (1991). For her work in television she earned 18 Primetime Emmy Award nominations including 12 consecutive nominations for Outstanding Actress in a Drama Series for her role as Jessica Fletcher in Murder, She Wrote (1984-1996). She also received four Golden Globe Awards for Murder, She Wrote. In 1997 she earned a Screen Actors Guild Life Achievement Award, and in 2003 she earned a Britannia Award for Lifetime Achievement in Television and Film.

Major associations

Academy Awards

Grammy Awards

Emmy Awards
Lansbury was nominated for eighteen Primetime Emmy Awards without a win, including twelve consecutive nominations as Outstanding Lead Actress in a Drama Series for every season of Murder, She Wrote, the most-nominated performer in this category.

Tony Awards
Lansbury won five competitive Tony Awards. She tied with Julie Harris, and was surpassed only by Audra McDonald with six wins for the most Tonys any performer has received. (Both Harris and Lansbury have also been awarded Special Tonys as their sixth non-competitive award.): Lansbury was one of only five perfomers who have been nominated for all four Tony acting awards, the others being Raúl Esparza, Jan Maxwell, Boyd Gaines, and Audra McDonald.

Theater awards

Drama Desk Awards

Laurence Olivier Awards

Outer Critics Circle Awards

Film and television awards

Golden Globe Awards
Lansbury was nominated for fifteen Golden Globes, and won six times. Lansbury tied with Alan Alda, Shirley MacLaine, and Jack Nicholson as the second-most awarded performer in acting categories, and surpassed only by Meryl Streep with eight wins.

BAFTA Awards

Screen Actors Guild Awards

Annie Award

Honorary Awards

 1968 Hasty Pudding Woman of the Year
 1981 nominated for the Saturn Award for Best Actress for The Mirror Crack'd
 1988 George and Ira Gershwin Award for Lifetime Musical Achievement, UCLA Spring Sing
 1994 Queen Elizabeth II appointed her a Commander of the Order of the British Empire "for services to the dramatic arts"
 1995 given the Disney Legend award
 1996 awarded the Women in Film Lucy Award in recognition of her excellence and innovation in her creative works that have enhanced the perception of women through the medium of television.
 1996 Screen Actors Guild Life Achievement Award
 1996 Television Critics Association Career Achievement Award
 1997 awarded the National Medal of Arts
 2000 Kennedy Center Honors Awards recipient
 2000 The New Dramatists Lifetime Achievement Award
 2002 The Acting Company's First Lifetime Achievement Award
 2003 awarded the Britannia Award for Lifetime Achievement by the British Academy Film Awards
 2004 The Actors Fund of America Lifetime Achievement
 2008 bestowed a Doctor of Humane Letters honoris causa degree from the University of Miami; she was also the guest speaker at the commencement ceremony
 2009 Drama League Award – The Unique Contribution to the Theatre Award
 2010 Drama League Honors
 2010 Signature Theatre Sondheim Award
 2010 Honorary Chairman of the American Theatre Wing
 2014 New Year's Honours List Queen Elizabeth II appointed her a Dame Commander of the Order of the British Empire "for services to drama and to charitable work and philanthropy".
 2022 Tony Awards Special Tony Award for Lifetime Achievement

Lansbury has two stars on the Hollywood Walk of Fame one for film (north side of the 6600 block of Hollywood Boulevard) and one for television (west side of the 1500 block of Vine Street)

In 1982, Lansbury was inducted into the American Theatre Hall of Fame. She was also inducted into the Television Hall of Fame of the Academy of Television Arts & Sciences, an honour she earned in 1996.

References

Further reading

Lists of awards received by American actor
Lists of awards received by British actor
Lists of awards received by Irish actor